Chizhi Shizhu Hou (150–196; r. 188–195 AD), personal name Yufuluo (於夫羅), was a puppet chanyu of the Southern Xiongnu during the late Han Dynasty. In 188, he was appointed chanyu by the Han court following the murder of his father Qiangqu and would later gain the Xiongnu title of Chizhi Shizhu Hou.

Biography

In 184, Qiangqu sent Yufuluo to assist the Han in fighting the Yellow Turban Rebellion.

After Qiangqu's death in 188, the Han court attempted to appoint the Western Tuqi Prince Yufuluo as chanyu, instead of using the traditional Xiongnu election system. The southern Xiongnu dissented and elected a lawful alternate leader of the Xubu line. Later they expelled Yufuluo, who fled to the Han imperial court. When the marquis of Xubu died the next year an elderly king became the nominal head of state without the title of chanyu and the Southern Xiongnu ceased to exist as a coherent entity.

Yufuluo fled to the Han court but found no support after the death of Emperor Ling of Han in 189. He became a wandering mercenary, working under the Yellow Turbans, Yuan Shao, and the Heishan bandits of Zhang Yan. After suffering several defeats to Cao Cao, Yufuluo relocated to Pingyang County close to the Fen River. He died in 195 and his remaining followers joined his brother Huchuquan.

Yufuluo's grandson Liu Yuan went on to found the state of Han Zhao in the fourth century.

Family
Brother
Huchuquan
Son
Liu Bao

See also
Lists of people of the Three Kingdoms

Footnotes

References

Bichurin N.Ya., "Collection of information on peoples in Central Asia in ancient times", vol. 1, p. 146, Sankt Petersburg, 1851, reprint Moscow-Leningrad, 1950  (Qian Han Shu Ch. 94b)

Taskin B.S., "Materials on Sünnu history", Science, Moscow, 1968, p. 31 (In Russian)

150 births
196 deaths
Chanyus
2nd-century monarchs in Asia